Purple Rain (Korean: 퍼플레인) was a South Korean rock band, formed during JTBC's  television talent show titled Superband in 2019. The band finished in the third place in the competition and signed with JTBC Studio on 24 October, 2019. They released a single in February 2020, titled "The King Must Die". The band's vocalist, Chae Bohun is also the vocalist and guitarist of alternative rock band The VANE. The band appeared in Immortal Songs: Singing the Legend several times, winning the trophy for the best performance of the night twice. They contributed a song to the soundtrack of the Korean television series My Country: The New Age.

On October 19, 2020, JTBC Studios announced the band had disbanded after officially concluding activities on the 14th. Chae Bo Hoon, Yang Ji Wan, Kim Ha Jin, and Jeong Gwang Hyun would return to their respective agencies while Nau Lee will continue under JTBC after signing an exclusive contract with them.

Members 
 Chae Bohun (채보훈) - vocals
 Yang Jiwan (양지완) - guitar
 Kim Hajin (김하진) - bass guitar
 Lee Na-woo (이나우) - piano/keyboards
 Jeong Gwang-hyeon (정광현) - drums

Discography

Studio albums

Extended plays

Singles
 "The King Must Die" (28 February, 2020)
 "Letter" (August 13, 2020)
Soundtrack
 "Bird" (My Country: The New Age OST; 8 November, 2019)

Television appearances

References 

South Korean rock music groups
Musical groups established in 2019
2019 establishments in South Korea